Tajči Cameron (born Tatjana Matejaš, on 1 July 1970) is a Croatian singer, television show host, published author and blogger, who now lives in the United States.

Career

As a pop star in the former Yugoslavia in the late 1980s and early 1990s, Tajči won the national selection of RTV Zagreb, SR Croatia and represented Yugoslavia at the Eurovision Song Contest 1990. The contest was held at Zagreb and she sang the song "Hajde da ludujemo" ("Let's go crazy"). Her Yugoslav music career was cut short by the breakup of Yugoslavia and the subsequent war.

She left Croatia in 1992 and a year later graduated from the American Musical and Dramatic Academy in New York. She appeared in numerous off Broadway productions and landed a lead role in "Miracle of Christmas" a mega-production at Sight and Sound Theatre, Lancaster, Pennsylvania. During her time in New York, she was signed by Camile Barbone and produced the "Age of Love" CD recorded at Long View Farms Studio.

In 1994, she returned to Croatia and starred in a production of Kiss Me Kate by Croatian National Theatre, Rijeka. She moved to Los Angeles in 1997 seeking to expand her performing skills through television and film. She continued her musical theater career with roles in Brigadoon produced by Starlight Theatre in San Diego and The Phantom of the Opera at the San Gabriel Mission Playhouse. In 1997-98, she produced a series of benefit concerts at the Sacred Heart Retreat House in Alhambra, California, where she met Matthew Cameron, whom she married in 1999. She ended up performing music in Roman Catholic churches while auditioning for roles, some of which she rejected because they required nudity.

In late 2004, she and her family relocated to Cincinnati, Ohio, a more central location for her heavy touring schedule with concerts. In 2011, Yamaha Entertainment Group produced a remake of her mega-hit from the 1990s "Dvije zvjezdice". She released an indie pop album Awaken in 2013 on which she collaborated with Bryan Lennox, a Grammy Award-winning producer. Tajči wrote a full-length musical, My Perfectly Beautiful Life, which was produced by Cincinnati Playwright Initiative at the Jarson-Kaplan Theatre in February 2010.

Tajci, her husband and their three children relocated to Franklin, Tennessee in 2014, the same year she started producing and hosting TV show "Waking Up in America" and in 2015 founded "Waking Up Revolution", a multi platform brand. She is also a certified Holistic Life Coach through Radiant Health Institute, certified as 65 hours of Approved Coach Specific Training Hours by the International Coach Federation.

Personal life
Tajči married Matthew Cameron, whom she met in church, in 1999. The couple have three sons, all raised in the Roman Catholic faith.

She lost her husband Matthew to Stage 4 non smokers' lung cancer in 2017.

Her sister is Croatian-American actress and singer Sanja Matejaš, known as Sanya Mateyas.

Discography
Hajde Da Ludujemo (1990)
Bube u glavi (1991)
Struggles & Graces (1997)
Now and Forever (2000)
Emmanuel – The Story of Christmas (2002)
Let It Be – Mary's Story (2003)
I Thirst (2004)
Zlatna kolekcija (2004)
A Chance to Dream (2006)
Need A Break (2008)
All american (1991)
The best of Tajči (1992)
The love collection (2011)
Taichi Eqinocij (1997)
God bless America (2010)
Dell'aurora tu sorgi piu bella (2011)
VHS Bube u glavi (1991)
AWAKEN (2014)

References

External links

 Cincinnati Enquirer: From pop stardom to an inner light
 "Nisam požalila prekid karijere"
 Official Site
 WakingUpRevolution Site
 iDoBelieve.com

1970 births
Living people
Croatian pop singers
Croatian Roman Catholics
20th-century Croatian women singers
Eurovision Song Contest entrants for Yugoslavia
Eurovision Song Contest entrants of 1990
Croatian emigrants to the United States
Musicians from Zagreb
21st-century Croatian women singers
Yugoslav women  singers